The House of Orlandi was an Italian political and military family of the Republic of Pisa, dating back as early as the 10th century.

History 
The Orlandi had a rivalry with the House of Della Gherardesca after Ugolino della Gherardesca's betrayal in the battle of Meloria.

There is a Orlandi Chapel in the church of Saint Francis in Pescia.

See also 
 History of Pisa
 Maritime republics
 Republic of Pisa

Sources 
 Guccio Nauesi: Istoria genealogica delle famiglie nobili toscane, et vmbre, Firenze 1671
 Touring Club of Italy: Toscana, Umbria, Marche, Milano 2002
 Antonio Musarra: 1284 La battaglia della Meloria, Roma 2018

Families of Pisa
Italian noble families